The European Physical Journal D: Atomic, Molecular, Optical and Plasma Physics is an academic journal recognized by the European Physical Society, presenting new and original research results.

Scope
The main areas covered are:
Atomic Physics
Molecular Physics and Chemical Physics
Atomic and Molecular Collisions
Clusters and Nanostructures
Cold Matter and Quantum Gases
Plasma Physics
Nonlinear Dynamics
Optical Phenomena and Photonics
Quantum Optics 
Quantum Information
Ultraintense and Ultrashort Laser Fields
 
The range of topics covered in these areas is extensive, from Molecular Interaction and Reactivity to Spectroscopy and Thermodynamics of Clusters, from Atomic Optics to Bose-Einstein Condensation to Femtochemistry.

History
The EPJ D arose from various predecessors: Il Nuovo Cimento (Section D), Journal de Physique, and Zeitschrift für Physik D. Prior to 1998, this journal was named Zeitschrift für Physik D: Atoms, Molecules and Clusters.

Until 2003, Ingolf Hertel was the editor-in-chief of EPJ D. From May 2003 on EPJ D had two editors-in-chief: Tito Arecchi and Jean-Michel Raimond. In January 2004, Arecchi stepped down and Franco A. Gianturco took over his position.

In 2009, the newly appointed (third) editor-in-chief, Kurt Becker, took on the responsibility for promoting the plasma physics coverage of the journal.

As of 2018, three editors-in-chief are Tommaso Calarco (Forschungszentrum Jülich, Germany), Holger Kersten (Christian-Albrechts-Universität zu Kiel, Germany) and 
Andrey V. Solov'yov (MBN Research Center, Frankfurt am Main, Germany).

See also
 European Physical Journal

Physics journals
EDP Sciences academic journals
Springer Science+Business Media academic journals
Publications established in 1998
Plasma science journals